James Brett Rice (born April 20, 1954) is an American film, television, and theater actor. He is perhaps known for his roles in the films Forrest Gump (1994), Remember the Titans (2000), Monster (2003), Super 8 (2011), Foxcatcher (2014), and Sully (2016).

Early life
Brett Rice was born in  1954 in Chattanooga, Tennessee, the oldest of four children. He attended a number of schools until finally he was sent to Marist Military Academy in Atlanta, after which he had a short time in the U.S. Army.

Acting career
He went with a friend to the theater building to wait as he auditioned for a show. While he waited the director asked him if he wanted to audition. He landed a role and from that moment on lived, ate and drank the theater. 
Over the next five years he went to every theater in Atlanta and auditioned for almost everything that came along. This included a TV pilot for The Catlins (1982) which led to a two-year contract. He got a part in The Bear (1984), with Gary Busey and then a role in a TV movie called Poison Ivy (1985), with Michael J. Fox, Adam Baldwin and Nancy McKeon. Work was hard to find for a while but he worked throughout the 1990s. He played in many TV shows such as In the Heat of the Night (1988), I'll Fly Away (1991), Walker, Texas Ranger (1993), and many more. Theatrical films included Edward Scissorhands (1990), Passenger 57 (1992), Kalifornia (1993), Forrest Gump (1994), From the Earth to the Moon (1998), The Waterboy (1998) and as a co-star in Remember the Titans (2000) in which he played Coach Tyrell opposite Denzel Washington and Will Patton. He had a guest appearance on the television show, Sheena (2000) in the episode "Stranded in the Jungle" (2002). Brett has over 75 credits for TV and film, and at least that many credits for the stage. He has become a Councilor at Large with SAG to get more closely involved with the unusual politics and negotiations with producers in Los Angeles and New York. He starred as Tucker Baggett in the A&E/Netflix series Longmire.

Filmography

External links

1954 births
Living people
American male film actors